Coastal Shipping Publications is a publishing company based in Portishead, a coastal town North Somerset. The company publishes specialised books and magazines about coastal shipping, maritime themes, 20th century merchant shipping and occasionally buses and trains.  The founders of the company are Bernard and Doreen McCall. The company is linked to an associate publishers, Mainline and Maritime.

History 
The first publication by Coastal Shipping was a book about the history of trade shipping in the port of Whitby in the 80s. The book was published in 1988, and that was the birth of the company. When Doreen and Bernard moved to Portishead, the first Coastal Shipping Magazine was printed in the Spring of 1994, and for 3 years was printed 4 times a year. Since then, the magazine has been printed bi-monthly.

Team 
Maritime author and publisher Bernard McCall headed the team. Doreen manages operations, marketing and events, publishing assistant Andrea works on design, advertising and digital marketing and Nicola looks after finance and administration.

Bernard was editor and publisher of Coastal Shipping magazine, which he founded some 28 years ago in 1994, until his untimely death on 20 August 2021. As a result Iain, his son has taken over as editor.

Publications

Coastal Shipping Magazine 
Coastal Shipping is a successful specialist magazine in its 26th year of publication. Published bi-monthly, it is fully illustrated in colour, has a minimum of 52 pages, and is printed in A5 size. The magazine contains articles covering contemporary issues from correspondents from around the world as well as historical pieces and memories from professional seafarers and enthusiasts. Regular features include Coaster of the Past - a nostalgic look at a once-familiar vessel; Standard Coasters - a review of specific classes of coasters; and Port Panorama- a pictorial survey of vessels in a port. Other articles cover news items about the ships and their trading patterns. The magazine is well received by subscribers, and is a high talking point within the maritime community.

Specialist Books 
Best-sellers include Coasters Around Britain which was reprinted 3 times and Dazzle-Painted Ships of World War 1 by Glyn Evans has proved to be very popular. In 2019 the in-house team published six titles and three titles are already planned for 2020.

Events 
Coastal Shipping Publications often take part in and organise ship shows. A full list of these events can be found here on the website. Upcoming ship shows next year include the South West Ship Show at BAWA Social Club, 589 Southmead Road, Filton, BRISTOL, BS34 7RG on Saturday 9 May and the North West Ship Show, on Saturday 3 October in Old Christ Church, Waterloo, Liverpool L22 1RE. The Coastal Shipping website gives full details of these and other events that are attended.

References 

Portishead, Somerset
Companies based in Somerset
Publishing companies of England